South Wood County Park is a county park in the U.S. state of Wisconsin. South Wood County Park was so named for its location relative to nearby North Wood County Park.

Amenities include a boat landing, camping area, and hiking trails.

References

Geography of Wood County, Wisconsin
Parks in Wisconsin